Allan Scott (born 17 August 1910, date of death unknown) was an English footballer who played as a striker for Liverpool, Swindon Town and Gillingham.

References

External links
 Liverpool profile
Swindon Town profile

1910 births
Year of death missing
English footballers
Liverpool F.C. players
Swindon Town F.C. players
Gillingham F.C. players
Association football inside forwards